"Flashing Lights" is a single performed by British drum and bass duo Chase & Status, featuring production from fellow producer and label mate Sub Focus and vocals from Takura Tendayi. The single was released as a digital download on 18 November 2011 and serves as the seventh overall, fifth official and final single from Chase & Status' second studio album No More Idols.

Takura Tendayi had previously collaborated with both Chase & Status and Sub Focus, appearing on their respective debut albums More than Alot and Sub Focus. He provided vocals for "Can't Get Enough", "Streetlife", "Running" and "Is It Worth It" by Chase & Status, as well as "World of Hurt" and "Coming Closer" by Sub Focus. He is also the vocalist in "No Problem", the opening track of No More Idols. "Flashing Lights" was Takura's first official single.

A music video to accompany the release of "Flashing Lights", directed by Ben Newman, was first released onto YouTube on 18 November 2011, at a total length of four minutes and thirty-four seconds.

Track listing

12" vinyl
RAM Records had released the S. P. Y remix on limited edition 12" picture disc vinyls on 21 April 2011 to celebrate Record Store Day.

Remixes
In 2012, remixes by dubstep duo KillSonik and rapper Mac Miller were released as a Beatport-exclusive and a free download, respectively.
 "Flashing Lights"  (KillSonik remix) – 4:41
 "Flashing Lights"  (Mac Miller remix) – 2:53

Credits and personnel
Lead vocals – Takura Tendayi
Producers – Saul Milton, Will Kennard, Nick Douwma
Songwriters – Will Kennard, Saul Milton, Nick Douwma, Takura Tendayi
Label: Mercury, MTA, RAM

Chart performance

Release history

References

2011 singles
Chase & Status songs
Mercury Records singles
MTA Records singles
Song recordings produced by Chase & Status
Songs written by Saul Milton
Songs written by Will Kennard
2011 songs
Songs written by Takura
Songs written by Sub Focus